Lee Seung-hwan (born December 13, 1965) is a South Korean singer and record producer known as the country's "King of Live Performances" for his frequent solo concerts. Lee debuted in 1989 as a pop ballad singer and later incorporated rock elements into his music. He has released numerous hit songs and is the president and founder of South Korean entertainment agency Dream Factory.

Personal life
Lee was born in Busan, South Korea, and attended Whimoon High School in Seoul.

He was married to actress Chae Rim from 2003 until their divorce in 2006.

Career 
Lee has released more than 10 different singles, albums and EPs that reached number one. This commercial success was repeated in South Korea; his own company, Dream Factory, estimated that he has sold over 10 million records, including singles. Lee is a first musician as a president of his company. His debut album, "...B.C 603" propelled him to stardom on October 15, 1989. He won the New Artist's Gold Disc in 1991. He has held more 1000 solo concerts and those concerts have been contributed to develop Korea pop-culture.

"Chakage Salja (lit, Let's Live a Good Life)" is a fund-raising concert which Lee hosts every year. Part of the money raised goes to Korean Childhood Leukemia Foundation.

Discography

Studio albums

Extended plays

Filmography

Television shows

Awards and nominations

Golden Disc Awards

Mnet Asian Music Awards

References

External links
 Dream Factory official website 

1965 births
K-pop singers
Living people
Musicians from Busan
South Korean composers
South Korean male singers
South Korean pop rock singers
MAMA Award winners
Korean Music Award winners
Melon Music Award winners
Whimoon High School alumni